The Men's 100 Butterfly event at the 10th FINA World Aquatics Championships swam 25–26 July 2003 in Barcelona, Spain. Preliminary and Semifinal heats swam July 25, with the prelims during the morning session and the semifinals in the evening session. The Final was held on July 26.

At the start of the event, the existing World (WR) and Championship (CR) records were both:
WR: 51.81 swum by Michael Klim (Australia) on December 12, 1999 in Canberra, Australia.
CR: 52.10 swum by Lars Frölander (Sweden) on July 26, 2001 in Fukuoka, Japan

Results

Final

Semifinals

Preliminaries

References

Men's 100 metre butterfly
Swimming at the 2003 World Aquatics Championships